Phrynella is a genus of frogs in the family Microhylidae. It is monotypic, being represented by the single species, Phrynella pulchra.
It is found in Indonesia, Malaysia, and Thailand.
Its natural habitats are subtropical or tropical moist lowland forests and intermittent freshwater marshes.
It is threatened by habitat loss.

References

External links
Amphibian and Reptiles of Peninsular Malaysia - Phrynella pulchra

Microhylidae
Taxa named by George Albert Boulenger
Taxonomy articles created by Polbot
Monotypic amphibian genera